This article is a bibliography of information for the Diplomatic Security Service, Bureau of Diplomatic Security.

 REWARDS FOR JUSTICE - DSS - Money for Information leading to the capture of Terrorists
  Pamphlet - DSS: A Global Law Enforcement Agency
  BBC article on DSS
 OFFICIAL U.S. Diplomatic Security Website
 U.S. Diplomatic Security Photo Gallery
 U.S. Diplomatic Security Pictorial History
 U.S. Diplomatic Security testifies before Senate's Homeland Security & Governmental Affairs Subcmte, SD-342
 U.S. Diplomatic Security's Assistant Secretary of State testifies before the Senate C-SPAN
 U.S. Diplomatic Security's Assistant Secretary of State testifies before the Senate on 6/29/2011 C-SPAN
 DS on C-SPAN
 Diplomatic Security Special Agents Association
 Diplomatic Security - Office of Foreign Missions
 Diplomatic Security WASHINGTON POST article
 Diplomatic Security - Mobile Security Deployments (MSD)
 1996 Secretary of State Warren Christopher presents awards for valor to DSS Special Agents - Transcript
 DS Special Agents at the Olympics
 CBS Evening News - DSS at the UN General Assembly 2009
 CBS Evening News - Diplomatic Security Behind the Scenes
 CBS NEWS 6 June 2011 - Keeping U.S. Officials Safe Overseas - DSS 
 CBS Evening News 22 Sept 2011 - DSS: Inside Hillary Clinton's Security Bubble
 AMW - America's Most Wanted Interview of RSO Rob Kelty - Diplomatic Security Service - 11 min. 15 sec. into the segment. Segment aired on February 27, 2010 on AMW
 AMW - America's Most Wanted - Behind the Scenes: Belize - DSS Special Agent (RSO) Rob Kelty interviewed by John Walsh
 Former DS Special Agent tells Fox News that radical Muslim cleric lied to qualify for U.S.- funded college scholarship
 VISA SECURITY - Stratfor.com
 DSS Special Agent Randall Bennett investigates Wall Street Journal reporter Daniel Pearl's murder
 DSS Segments/Clips
 DSS and America's Most Wanted
 Diplomatic Security 2010 Year in Review - Vigilant In an Uncertain World
 PROVIDING FALSE INFORMATION ON PASSPORT APPLICATIONS LEADS TO FEDERAL PROSECUTIONS
 U.S. Diplomatic Security - 2010 Year in Review
 Defense Standard Magazine, Winter 2010 Pg 76, Diplomatic Security - ACTIVE DIPLOMACY
 Diplomatic Security Service Protecting U.S. Officials Overseas
 U.S. Investigates Syrian Diplomats for Spying on Protesters - State Department may limit their travel
 Female DSS Agents in ELLE Magazine
 Marine Museum honors partnership between Corps' Security Guard Program & the Diplomatic Security Service
 State Magazine, October 2011 - DS Keeps Watch in Northern Afghanistan
 ICE-HSI & DSS: Authorities Bust Strip Club Operation that Illegally Employed Hundreds
 U.S. Diplomatic Security in Iraq After the Withdrawal
 L.A. Times: Robert Downey, Jr. plays DSS Agent 1998 
 L.A. Arsons: Federal agent tips helped lead to suspect's capture
 Harrisburg, Pennsylvania Couple Charged After Human Trafficking Investigation
 Personal Security Overseas: Bruce Tully, DSS Ret. (Part 1)
 Police Officers Drill on Protecting Diplomats in Abingdon, Virginia Under the Supervision of Special Agents of the Bureau of Diplomatic Security
 REWARDS FOR JUSTICE (RFJ) Robert Hartung  of DS Testifies Before Congress
 DSS agents at Westboro service for Iraq bomb victim
 Retired ‘Phrogs’ USMC CH-46E leap back into service
 Inside the Secret NATO Command Center
 DSS at the NATO Multi-agency Communications Center - Chicago
 DSS Facebook
 Diplomatic Security Training Center (DSTC)
 High Threat Training Video

See also
 Bureau of Diplomatic Security
 Diplomatic Security Service

Bureau of Diplomatic Security
Bibliography